Hannah McKibbin (born 7 August 1985) is a British individual rhythmic gymnast. She represents her nation at international competitions.

She participated at the 2004 Summer Olympics in Athens. She also competed at world championships, including at the 2001 and 2003 World Rhythmic Gymnastics Championships. She had her highest placement finishing 14th in All-around at the 2001 World Championships in Madrid, Spain.

References

1985 births
Living people
British rhythmic gymnasts
Sportspeople from London
Gymnasts at the 2004 Summer Olympics
Olympic gymnasts of Great Britain
21st-century British women